Colégio Militar station is part of the Blue Line of the Lisbon Metro and is located in Lisbon.

History
The station opened on 14 October 1988, in conjunction with the Alto dos Moinhos and Laranjeiras stations, and it is located on Avenida do Colégio Militar, close to the military school from which it takes its name and Estádio da Luz, home of SL Benfica. Built over it is an important bus terminal and the shopping mall Colombo Centre. 

The architectural design of the station is by António J. Mendes.

Throughout 2019, lifts were expected to be added to this station, making the station accessible for persons with disabilities.

Connections

Urban buses

Carris 
 703 Charneca ⇄ Bairro de Santa Cruz
 729 Bairro Padre Cruz ⇄ Algés
 750 Estação Oriente (Interface) ⇄ Algés
 764 Cidade Universitária ⇄ Damaia de Cima
 765 Colégio Militar (Metro) ⇄ Rua João Ortigão Ramos
 767 Campo Mártires da Pátria ⇄ Reboleira (Metro)
 799 Colégio Militar (Metro) ⇄ Alfragide Norte

Suburban buses

Rodoviária de Lisboa 
 210 Lisboa (Colégio Militar) ⇄ Caneças (Jardim)

Vimeca / Lisboa Transportes 
 101 Lisboa (Colégio Militar) ⇄ Tercena
 128 Casal da Mira (Dolce Vita Tejo) ⇄ Lisboa (Colégio Militar)
 132 A-da-Beja (Largo) ⇄ Lisboa (Colégio Militar)
 142 Casal da Mira (Dolce Vita Tejo) ⇄ Lisboa (Colégio Militar)
 163 Lisboa (Colégio Militar) ⇄ Massamá (Casal do Olival)

See also
 List of Lisbon metro stations

References

External links

Blue Line (Lisbon Metro) stations
Railway stations opened in 1988